Anna Sharevich (born December 18, 1985) is a Belarusian and American chess player holding the title of Woman Grandmaster (WGM). She won the Women's Belarusian Chess Championship in 2002, 2005, 2007 and 2011.

Sharevich played for team Belarus in the Women's Chess Olympiad in 2002, 2004, 2006, 2008, 2010 and 2012. In 2014, she transferred national federations from Belarus to United States. She was a member of team Saint Louis Arch Bishops, the 2014 champions of the United States Chess League.

References

External links
 
 Anna Sharevich chess games at 365Chess.com
 

1985 births
Living people
Chess woman grandmasters
American female chess players
Belarusian female chess players
Chess Olympiad competitors
Sportspeople from Brest, Belarus
21st-century American women